Llubí is a small municipality on Majorca, one of the Balearic Islands, Spain. It has population of 1,800 inhabitants.

Llubí is mostly known for its cultivation of capers and traditional Majorcan architecture.

References

Municipalities in Mallorca
Populated places in Mallorca